Shamabad may refer to:
 Shamabad, Kerman
 Shamabad, Razavi Khorasan